Two warships of Sweden have been named Östergötland, after Östergötland:

 , a galley launched in 1749.
 , a  launched in 1956 and stricken in 1982.
 , a  launched in 1988 and since in active service.

Swedish Navy ship names